The Inner Circle is the fifth studio album by Swedish progressive metal band Evergrey, released in 2004. The album is a concept album that deals with the themes of religion, cults, and child abuse. According to an interview with frontman Tom S. Englund, the spoken word parts in the album are of an actual person.
The last track on the album, "When the Walls Go Down" samples excerpts from David Wilkerson's speech "A Call to Anguish".

Track listing

Personnel

Band
Tom S. Englund – vocals and guitar
Henrik Danhage – guitar
Michael Håkansson – bass
Rikard Zander – keyboards
Jonas Ekdahl – drums

Other
Carina Englund – vocals
Gothenburg Symphony Orchestra – string quartet

References

Evergrey albums
2004 albums
Concept albums
Inside Out Music albums